Historic District B is a national historic district located at Boonville, Cooper County, Missouri.  It encompasses 23 contributing buildings in a predominantly residential section of Boonville.  The district includes representative examples of Late Victorian style architecture.  Notable buildings include the Dukes Residence (1900-1910), Windsor Residence (c. 1910), Hofstedler Residence (1920-1925), Short Residence (1908), Hain Residence (1836-1840), Hickam Estate Property (1840s), Christ Church Episcopal (1844-1846), and Christ Church Episcopal (1870, 1908).

It was listed on the National Register of Historic Places in 1983.

References

Historic districts on the National Register of Historic Places in Missouri
Victorian architecture in Missouri
National Register of Historic Places in Cooper County, Missouri
Boonville, Missouri